The 2019–20 Liiga season is the 45th season of the Liiga (formerly SM-liiga), the top level of ice hockey in Finland, since the league's formation in 1975. The last two game days (12 and 14 March 2020) of the regular season were scheduled to be played in front of an empty arena due to the Finnish government advising that all public events with more than 500 attendees will be cancelled or postponed. On 13 March, the rest of the season, which included the final round of the regular season and all of playoffs, was cancelled due to the COVID-19 pandemic.

The Finnish championship was not awarded for the first time since 1944 when the 1943–44 SM-sarja season was cancelled due to the Continuation War.

Teams

Regular season

Usually the top six advance straight to quarter-finals, while teams between 7th and 10th positions play wild card round for the final two spots. However, due to the COVID-19 pandemic, the last game day of the season was not played and no playoffs were held. The top 4 teams of the unfinished regular season qualified for the Champions Hockey League and the 5th team to the Spengler Cup. The Liiga is a closed series and thus there is no relegation.

Rules for classification: 1) Points; 2) 3-point wins 3) Goal difference; 4) Goals scored; 4) Head-to-head points.

See also
 2019–20 Mestis season

References

External links 
Official site 

Liiga seasons
Liiga
Liiga
Liiga season